George Davison (born 1890) was a professional association footballer, who played in the Southern League for Coventry City and Bristol Rovers.

Davison joined Coventry from Blyth Spartans in 1913, and scored eighteen times in the Southern League during the 1913–14 season. He signed for Bristol Rovers on 27 April 1914 for a large, though undisclosed, transfer fee. He was The Pirates top goalscorer in 1914–15 with 15 goals, then after a two-year interruption in league football caused by World War I, he returned for the 1919–20 campaign. He returned to his native North East England in 1920, when he joined West Stanley.

References

1890 births
Date of birth missing
Year of death missing
Footballers from Newcastle upon Tyne
English footballers
Association football forwards
Blyth Spartans A.F.C. players
Coventry City F.C. players
Bristol Rovers F.C. players
West Stanley F.C. players
Southern Football League players